Kevin Ford (born August 7, 1992), also known by his stage name KEVI / PRINCE$$ ROSIE, is an American DJ, producer and singer. He became famous as a member of the DJ trio Cheat Codes alongside Matthew Russell and Trevor Dahl. They gained international success with their single "Sex" and are from Los Angeles, California.

Early life 
Kevin Ford was born on August 7, 1992 in the United States. One year after Trevor Dahl began his career, he and Matthew Russell formed Cheat Codes, an electronic dance music trio. He is originally from Calabasas, California.

Career 
Cheat Codes' hit song "Sex" went ARIA Platinum as well as BPI Gold and peaked at number two on Norway and Swedish singles chart. Cheat Codes' 2017 hit "No Promises" features Demi Lovato, and their 2019 hit "Ferrari" features Afrojack.

Discography

References 

Atlantic Records artists
Dance-pop musicians
Electronic dance music musicians
Living people
Spinnin' Records artists
1992 births
21st-century American singers